SpVgg SV Weiden, formerly just SpVgg Weiden, is a German association football club from the city of Weiden, Bavaria.
Playing in the tier-four Regionalliga Süd in 2010–11, the club had to declare insolvency after being more than Euro 1 million in debt. Unable to raise enough funds to continue competing in the league, Weiden declared on 30 November 2010 that it would withdraw its Regionalliga team and thereby automatically be relegated. All games for the club in the 2010–11 season were declared void.

History

The side originated with the 1912 establishment of a football department in the gymnastics club Turnerbund Weiden. The footballers became independent on 19 January 1924 and enjoyed some early success in capturing local titles in 1924 and 1931, gaining promotion to the Bezirksliga Bayern for one season. Between 1929 and 1934 they were united with Fußball Club Windischeschenbach to play as SpVgg Weiden-Windischeschenbach. In 1934, the team qualified to play in the Gauliga Bayern, one of sixteen top flight divisions formed in the 1933 re-organization of German football under the Third Reich. They were relegated to lower level play after just one season, but returned to the Gauliga in 1941 in a union with Reichsbahn SV Weiden as part of the combined wartime side Reichsbahn Sport- und Spielvereinigung Weiden. This club remained in the top flight until the end of World War II.

Following the war the side resumed play as SpVgg Weiden and slipped to lower-tier football before making a comeback in the Landesliga Bayern (II) in 1947, making a fleeting single season appearance in second division play in 1954–55. In between, the club played in the Amateurliga Bayern (III), generally as a top side with good results.

The club failed to qualify for the new single-division Amateurliga Bayern and had to enter the new tier-four Landesliga Bayern-Mitte instead. It took out the league title there and advanced to the tier-two Regionalliga Süd in its first season back in the Amateurliga. Weiden only managed one season in the Regionalliga and was back in the Amateurliga in 1966. It remained a strong side there, taking out second places in 1971 and 1972 but, in 1975, it found itself relegated.

From 1977 to 1981, the club fell as far as the tier-five Bezirksliga but then returned to the Landesliga and, from there, back to what was now the Amateur Oberliga Bayern in 1985.

From the mid-80s on into the mid-90s the club played as a third division side and, following league re-structuring, carried on in what became the fourth tier Oberliga Bayern. Early in the 90s the team made first round appearances in German Cup play (1991 and 1992). After faltering briefly Weiden returned to Oberliga play on the strength of a Landesliga Bayern-Mitte (V) title in 2006. In the 2006–07 and 2007–08 seasons, the club finished eight in this league in both years. The 2008–09 season proved a very successful one for the club, winning the league and earning promotion to the Regionalliga Süd, a league it hasn't played in since 1966. It only lasted for two seasons at this level, declaring insolvency and thereby being automatically relegated and its record expunged. The club reformed as SpVgg Weiden 2010 and continued to field a team in the Landesliga in 2010–11, with the reserve team being elevated to first team status but suffering relegation. The club however fulfilled the qualifying norms of the Bavarian Football Association to continue on in the tier below, the Bezirksoberliga Oberpfalz rather than to reform in the lowest division.

At the end of the 2011–12 season the club qualified directly for the newly expanded Landesliga after finishing third in the Bezirksoberliga. The following season the club took out the championship in the Landesliga in convincing fashion with a 30-point gap to the second placed team and 33 wins in 38 games, thereby earning promotion back to the Bayernliga. Back in the Bayernliga the club finished fifth in 2013–14.

SpVgg Weiden has historically fielded a strong youth program. In 2010, its C-Junior (Under 15) team featured in the Las Vegas Mayor's Cup International Soccer Tournament, one of the top youth football tournaments in the United States.

Stadium
SpVgg Weiden plays in the Stadion am Wasserwerk, opened in 1928 and renovated in 2009 (capacity 7,600, with 1,000 covered seats). A record 15,000 fans took in a 1967 match against SSV Jahn Regensburg (0–3).

Honours
The club's honours:

League
 Upper Palatinate/Lower Bavaria championship
 Champions: (3) 1934, 1940, 1941
 Bayernliga (V)
 Champions: (3) 1954 (south), 1965, 2009
 Runners-up: (2) 1971, 1972
 Landesliga Bayern-Mitte (V)
 Champions: (5) 1954, 1964, 1985, 1988, 2006
 Runners-up: 1995
 Landesliga Bayern-Nordost
 Champions: 2013

Cup
 Bavarian Cup
 Winner: 2009
 Runners-up: 2015
 Oberpfalz Cup
 Winner: (3) 1996, 1997, 2009

Youth
 Bavarian Under 19 championship
 Runners-up: 1962

Recent managers
Recent managers of the club:

Recent seasons
The recent season-by-season performance of the club:

SpVgg Weiden

SpVgg Weiden II

With the introduction of the Bezirksoberligas in 1988 as the new fifth tier, below the Landesligas, all leagues below dropped one tier. With the introduction of the Regionalligas in 1994 and the 3. Liga in 2008 as the new third tier, below the 2. Bundesliga, all leagues below dropped one tier. With the establishment of the Regionalliga Bayern as the new fourth tier in Bavaria in 2012 the Bayernliga was split into a northern and a southern division, the number of Landesligas expanded from three to five and the Bezirksoberligas abolished. All leagues from the Bezirksligas onward were elevated one tier.

DFB Cup appearances
The club has qualified for the first round of the German Cup three times, the most recent in 2009:

References

Sources
 Grüne, Hardy (2001). Vereinslexikon. Kassel: AGON Sportverlag

External links
Official team site
Das deutsche Fußball-Archiv historical German domestic league tables (in German)
SpVgg Weiden profile at Weltfussball.de

Football clubs in Germany
Football clubs in Bavaria
Association football clubs established in 1924
Football in Upper Palatinate
1924 establishments in Germany